Michigan Stars Football Club is an American professional soccer team based in the Metro Detroit area. The team currently competes in the National Independent Soccer Association (NISA).

History 
The club was established circa 1998 as Windsor Spartans FC in Windsor, Ontario, Canada. In 2012, the team moved to the Metro Detroit area in Michigan, and joined the National Premier Soccer League as FC Sparta Michigan for the 2013 season. In January 2014, the team was purchased by Dearborn Sports Enterprise (DSE) and rebranded Michigan Stars FC.

The team went on hiatus for the 2018 season, and during this time, George Juncaj purchased a 50% stake in the club. The team returned for the NPSL 2019 season and the 2019 NPSL Members Cup. In the beginning of September, Juncaj purchased the remaining 50% of the club and on September 21, 2019, Michigan Stars FC were announced as a National Independent Soccer Association expansion team that would take part in the league's Spring half of the 2019-20 season.

Players and staff

Current roster

Year-by-year

References

External links
Official website

Soccer clubs in Michigan
National Independent Soccer Association teams
Macomb County, Michigan